Stylocordylidae is a family of sponges belonging to the order Suberitida.

Genera:
 Stylocordyla Thomson, 1873

References

Sponge families